is a Japanese dancer. He is a member of Exile in which he is a former performer and a member of Dance Earth Party. He is a former member of the first generation J Soul Brothers and Rather Unique. He is married to actress Arisa Sugi since 2017.

Career
In 1994, Usami, along with Toshio Matsumoto and Makidai, formed the dance team Baby Nail.

In 1998, he joined the dance team Japanese Soul Brothers.

In 1999, Usami joined the first generation J Soul Brothers, and made their debut in 20 October with their eponymous single "J Soul Brothers".

On 24 August 2001, the J Soul Brothers were renamed into Exile, and re-debuted in 27 September with the single "Your eyes only –Aimaina boku no Rinkaku–".

In 2004, he organized the group Rather Unique.

In June 2006, Usami made his acting debut in the stage play The Mensetsu.

Later in the same year, he started the dance project Dance Earth.

On 29 April 2015, Usami changed his name Usa (stylized as USA) to Üsa. Later in 22 June, he, along with Matsumoto and Makidai, announced that he will retire from performing with Exile at the end of the year. In 31 December, Usami's last performance with Exile was in the Tokyo Broadcasting System series CDTV Special! Toshikoshi Premiere Live 2015→2016.

Personal life 
On October 22, 2017, it was announced that Üsa had married actress Arisa Sugi after 7 years of dating.

On September 21, 2018, the couple revealed to be expecting their first child. At this time Arisa Sugi also announced she will be joining LDH Japan.

On February 21, 2019, they welcomed their first son.

Participating groups

Filmography

※Bold roles are shown as his starring works

Films

TV programmes

Advertisements

Radio

Voice acting

Music videos

Magazine serialisations

Others

Bibliography

Books

References

External links
 on Exile Official Website 

Japanese male dancers
Japanese hip hop musicians
People from Yokohama
1977 births
Living people
LDH (company) artists